Thomas Lundblad (born 13 May 1967) is a Swedish fencer. He competed in the individual and team épée events at the 1992 Summer Olympics.

References

External links
 

1967 births
Living people
Swedish male épée fencers
Olympic fencers of Sweden
Fencers at the 1992 Summer Olympics
Sportspeople from Uppsala
20th-century Swedish people